Nik Safiah binti Nik Abdul Karim (born 17 December 1939 in Kota Bharu, Kelantan) is a Malay language grammarian in Malaysia. She earned her PhD from Ohio University and is former dean of the Faculty of Arts and Social Science at University of Malaya.

Bibliography
 Panorama Bahasa Melayu Sepanjang Zaman :Universiti Malaya Publication, 2010.	  
 Tatabahasa Dewan DBP , 2008.
 Tan Sri Fatimah : potret seorang pemimpin / Nik Safiah Karim, Rokiah Talib  
 Malay grammar for academics and professionals ; DBP, 1995.	  
 Women in Malaysia / (editor), Hing Ai Yun, Nik Safiah Karim, Rokiah Talib.: Pelanduk Publications, 1984.	 
 Bahasa Melayu : teori dan aplikasinya / (Editor) Nik Safiah Karim. : Sarjana Enterprise, 1980.

References

1939 births
Living people
People from Kelantan
Academic staff of the University of Malaya
Linguists from Malaysia
Women linguists
21st-century linguists
Linguists of Malay
20th-century linguists